Balloch (IPA:[ˈpaləˈanˈɫ̪ɔxə]) is a residential village  east of the city of Inverness, Scotland.

Many children living in the area attend Culloden Academy. Balloch also has a primary school, local shop, a village hall, a bowling club, a village trust and a community council. The Scottish School of Forestry also opened in Balloch in 2015, as part of Inverness College UHI.

Like nearby Culloden, Balloch is a village of some antiquity.

References

External links 

Balloch Community Council website

Areas of Inverness
Populated places in Inverness committee area